Natalia Rodríguez may refer to:

Natalia Cruz (born 1976), née Natalia Rodriguez Carrillo, Colombian journalist in the United States
Natalia (Spanish singer), Natalia Rodríguez Gallego (born 1982), Spanish singer
Natalia Rodríguez (athlete) (born 1979), Spanish athlete